Tämä ikuinen talvi (This Eternal Winter) is the fourth demo album of the Finnish folk metal band Moonsorrow, released in the very beginning of 1999 by Meat Hook Productions. It was re-released on 28 August 2001 on CD by Sagittarius Productions, with significantly remastered music and vocals. Some vocal tracks were redone with different lyrics.

Track listing
 “Taistelu Pohjolasta” (The Battle for Pohjola) – 12:12
 “Osa I – Luo veljien” (To Brothers) – 4:42
 “Osa II – Punaisen lumen valtakunta” (The Realm of Red Snow) – 4:41
 “Osa III – Jäisten järvien kimalteessa” (In the Glare of Icy Lakes) – 2:49
 “Vihreällä valtaistuimella” (On the Green Throne) – 8:47
 “Talvi” (Winter) – 8:41
 “Luopion veri” (Apostate's Blood) – 9:22
 “Kuun suru” (Moonsorrow) – 3:53

Credits
Henri Sorvali – guitars, keyboards, drum programming, mouth harp, clean vocals
Ville Sorvali – bass, vocals

Additional musicians for the 2001 re-release
Baron Tarwonen – backing vocals
Lord Eurén – backing vocals
Mitja Harvilahti – backing vocals

1999 albums
Moonsorrow albums
Demo albums